Pillaiyarpatti is a village in the Thanjavur taluk of the Thanjavur district in the Indian state of Tamil Nadu.

Demographics 

As per the 2008 census, Pillaiyarpatti had a population of 4856 with 2299 males and 2557 females. The sex ratio was 892 and the literacy rate, 83.57.

President Name : Srimathi Kowsalya Ananthan.

References 

 

Villages in Thanjavur district